Decade of Drive is a greatest hits album by Canadian country music group Emerson Drive. The album was released in Canada on February 8, 2011 via Open Road Recordings. The album features 13 of the band's hits and three new songs. The album's first single, "When I See You Again", was written in memory of the group's former bassist, Patrick Bourque, who committed suicide in September 2007.  It was released to Canadian radio in late 2010. The album's second single "Let Your Love Speak" was released to U.S. country radio in 2011. The album's third single "Sleep It Off" was released to Canadian country radio on August 1, 2011.

Track listing

Chart performance

Singles

References

2011 albums
Albums produced by Kevin Churko
Emerson Drive albums
Open Road Recordings compilation albums